The Military Order of Merit of the Companions of Artigas (Spanish: El Orden Militar al Mérito Tenientes de Artigas), was a military decoration of Uruguay.

History
The Military Order of Merit of the Companions of Artigas was established by Law N° 14.955 on 13 November 1979. It was created by the ruling civilian-military administration, which governed Uruguay between 1973 and 1985. The name "tenientes de Artigas" or "Companions of Artigas" honours the 19th-century freedom-fighter José Gervasio Artigas. The statutes governing the order were further modified in 1980, and ultimately repealed on 6 March 1985.

In 1991, the government of Uruguay established the Medal of Military Merit as the highest military decoration of the Army of Uruguay. It uses the same ribbon as the Military Order of Merit of the Companions of Artigas.

Classes
The order was awarded in five different classes:
 Grand Cross
 Grand Officer
 Commander
 Officer
 Knight

References

External links

Military decorations and medals of Uruguay
Awards established in 1979
1979 establishments in Uruguay
1985 disestablishments in Uruguay